In the run up to the 2023 Spanish general election, various organisations carry out opinion polling to gauge the opinions that voters hold towards political leaders. Results of such polls are displayed in this article. The date range for these opinion polls is from the previous general election, held on 10 November 2019, to the present day.

Preferred Prime Minister
The tables below list opinion polling on leader preferences to become Prime Minister.

All candidates

Sánchez vs. Feijóo

Sánchez vs. Casado

Sánchez vs. Ayuso

Sánchez vs. Díaz

Ayuso vs. Díaz

Abascal vs. Iglesias

Predicted Prime Minister
The table below lists opinion polling on the perceived likelihood for each leader to become Prime Minister.

All candidates

Sánchez vs. Feijóo

Sánchez vs. Casado

Leader ratings
The table below lists opinion polling on leader ratings, on a 0–10 scale: 0 would stand for a "terrible" rating, whereas 10 would stand for "excellent".

Approval ratings
The tables below list the public approval ratings of the leaders and leading candidates of the main political parties in Spain.

Pedro Sánchez

Alberto Núñez Feijóo

Pablo Casado

Santiago Abascal

Yolanda Díaz

Pablo Iglesias

Inés Arrimadas

Íñigo Errejón

References